Dustin Brown and Jonathan Marray were the defending champions but Marray decided not to participate.
Brown played alongside Jamie Delgado, but they lost in the quarterfinals to Dominik Meffert and Philipp Oswald.
Andreas Beck and Martin Fischer defeated Martin Emmrich and Rameez Junaid 7–6(7–2), 6–0 in the final to win the title.

Seeds

Draw

Draw

References
 Main Draw

Rai Open - Doubles
2013 Doubles